Mūsā ibn ʿĪsā ibn Mūsā al-Hāshimī was an 8th century AD Abbasid prince. The son of Isa ibn Musa, he was posted to various governorships throughout his career, including Kufa, Egypt, Damascus, Mecca, Medina, and Arminiya, and was a leading commander at the Battle of Fakhkh.

Career

Background and succession dispute
Musa was born (according to one account, in ) to Isa ibn Musa, a member of the Banu al-Abbas who served as a long-running governor of Kufa during the first years of the Abbasid Caliphate. An extended relation of the Abbasid dynasty, Musa was a great-nephew of its first two caliphs al-Saffah and al-Mansur; he was also connected to the ruling line by his marriage to Ulayya, daughter of the third caliph al-Mahdi.

Under the succession arrangements made by al-Saffah in 754, Musa's father Isa was originally the designated second heir-apparent to the caliphate after al-Saffah's brother al-Mansur; in 764/5, however, Isa was pressured by al-Mansur into yielding his rights and recognizing the caliph's son al-Mahdi's claims to the throne ahead of his own. According to some versions of this event, Musa feared that al-Mansur would have his father killed if he refused to step aside; he therefore worked together with the caliph and helped to convince Isa to withdraw from the succession.

Under al-Mahdi and al-Hadi
During the reign of al-Mahdi Isa ibn Musa was permanently stripped of his succession rights to the caliphate, but aside from this Musa and his family appear to have remained in good standing. In 780 he escorted the future caliph Harun al-Rashid on an expedition against the Byzantine Empire, and following the death of Isa in 783 he was given the governorship of his father's old power base of Kufa.

In 786 Musa was one of the Abbasid commanders who successfully put down a pro-Alid rebellion in Mecca at the Battle of Fakhkh, with he and al-Abbas ibn Muhammad ibn Ali leading the left wing of the army during the fighting. Despite having played a prominent role in the victory, he afterwards received criticism for his decision to execute al-Hasan ibn Muhammad, a son of Muhammad al-Nafs al-Zakiyya who had participated in the revolt. As punishment for failing to keep al-Hasan alive for judgement, the caliph al-Hadi ordered that Musa's goods and properties be confiscated, and they remained under sequestration until al-Hadi's death later that year.

Under Harun al-Rashid
Musa was particularly active following the accession of his second cousin Harun al-Rashid, who appointed him to a slew of positions in the early part of his reign. During this period he was again placed in charge of Kufa on three or four separate occasions, and was also appointed governor of Mecca and Medina (and, according to some sources, the Yemen). In 797 and 799 he served as the leader of the pilgrimage in Mecca.

Under Harun Musa had three stints as governor of Egypt, in 787–789, 791–792, and 795–796. During his first governorship he reversed the anti-Christian edicts of his predecessor Ali ibn Sulayman al-Hashimi and allowed the Copts to rebuild the churches that Ali had ordered destroyed. His time in Egypt was otherwise relatively uneventful, although his second governorship was brought to an end after Harun received complaints about his conduct in the province.

In 793 Musa was appointed as governor of Damascus. Upon his arrival in Syria he undertook a monthlong expedition in the Hauran in an unsuccessful effort to hunt down the Qaysi Abu al-Haydham, who had raised the standard of rebellion a few months prior. After subsequent further attempts to kill or capture Abu Haydham likewise ended in failure, Musa was recalled by the caliph and he departed from the region, leaving Abd al-Salam ibn Humayd to manage affairs in his stead.

In 794 Musa was made governor of Arminiya, which had recently been pacified following an extensive campaign undertaken by the central government to defeat several ongoing rebel movements. He remained in the province for a year before a fresh outbreak of unrest caused the region to once again fall into turmoil; as a result he was dismissed and replaced with Yahya al-Harashi.

Death
Various dates are given for Musa's death, including 799 (at the age of 55), 803, and 805.

Notes

References
 
 
 
 
 
 
 
 
 
  
 
 
 

8th-century Abbasid governors of Egypt
Abbasid governors of Egypt
Abbasid governors of Damascus
Abbasid governors of Medina
Abbasid governors of Mecca
Abbasid governors of Arminiya
Abbasids
8th-century Arabs